The 2009–10 Slohokej League season was the first season of the Slohokej League.

The competition was made up of six teams from Slovenia, two teams from Croatia, and one team from Austria and Serbia each. The season was composed of the regular season and the playoffs. In the regular season, each team played triple round-robin with 27 games. The best eight teams of the regular season advanced to the playoffs.

Maribor became the first champions on 2 March 2009.

Teams

Three teams were farm/junior teams from EBEL – Austrian Hockey League teams:  HK Olimpija Ljubljana, HD Mladi Jesenice and Junior Graz 99ers.

Standings after the regular season
The regular season winner was Triglav Kranj.

Play-offs

Quarter-finals
Olimpija – Partizan 1–5 (0–2, 0–1, 1–2)
Partizan – Olimpija 4–3 (1–0, 2–3, 1–0)
Bled – Maribor 2–7 (2–4, 0–1, 0–2)
Maribor – Bled 6–2 (2–0, 1–1, 2–1)
Slavija – Triglav Kranj 1–4 (0–3, 1–0, 0–1)
Triglav Kranj – Slavija 5–2 (2–1, 1–1, 2–0)
Mladi Jesenice – Medveščak II 2–1 (2–0, 0–0, 0–1)
Medveščak II – Mladi Jesenice 3–9 (0–3, 1–4, 2–2)

Semi-finals
Triglav Kranj – Partizan 3–4 (0–1, 2–2, 1–1)
Partizan – Triglav Kranj 5–1 (1–0, 2–1, 2–0)
Mladi Jesenice – Maribor 1–3 (0–1, 1–0, 0–2)
Maribor – Mladi Jesenice 3–1 (1–0, 1–0, 1–1)

Final
Maribor – Partizan 3–2 (1–1, 0–1, 2–0)
Partizan – Maribor 2–3 (0–1, 1–0, 1–2)

References

2009–10 in European ice hockey leagues
Slohokej
Slohokej League seasons
Slohokej